The Helsinki City Centre (Finnish: Helsingin kantakaupunki, Swedish: Helsingfors innerstad) originally referred to the area belonging to the city of Helsinki, Finland before the great annexation on 1 January 1946. After the annexation the names "Helsinki Centre" and "annexed area" were used, forming the area of Greater Helsinki together. The Helsinki Centre referred to the quarters 1 through 27. The city council often referred to the parts as the city centre and the suburbs (Finnish: kantakaupunki - esikaupungit, Swedish: stadskärnan - förstäderna). The area started to be referred to as the central business district in the 1960s.

In early 2014 there were 106,201 inhabitants in the southern major district of Helsinki.

See also
 Subdivisions of Helsinki
 Helsinki urban area

References

Subdivisions of Helsinki
Central business districts